The Little Buffalo River Bridge is a historic bridge in central Newton County, Arkansas. The bridge carries Arkansas Highway 327 across the Little Buffalo River between Parthenon and Jasper. It was built in 1939.

The bridge was listed on the National Register of Historic Places in 1995.

See also
List of bridges documented by the Historic American Engineering Record in Arkansas
List of bridges on the National Register of Historic Places in Arkansas
National Register of Historic Places listings in Newton County, Arkansas

References

External links

Historic American Engineering Record in Arkansas
Road bridges on the National Register of Historic Places in Arkansas
Bridges completed in 1939
National Register of Historic Places in Newton County, Arkansas
Concrete bridges in the United States
1939 establishments in Arkansas
Transportation in Newton County, Arkansas
National Register of Historic Places in Buffalo National River